Livius is a genus of South American tangled nest spiders containing the single species, Livius macrospinus. It was  first described by V. D. Roth in 1967, and has only been found in Chile.

References

External links
 

Amaurobiidae
Monotypic Araneomorphae genera
Spiders of South America
Endemic fauna of Chile